Mirza Mujčić (born 7 April 1994) is a Swedish footballer of Bosnian descent who plays as a centre-back for Swiss club Neuchâtel Xamax.

Career

Schaffhausen
In the beginning of January 2020, Mujčić joined Swiss Challenge League club FC Schaffhausen on a deal for the rest of the season.

Xamax
On 15 May 2022, Mujčić signed a two-year contract with Neuchâtel Xamax.

References

External links
 
 
 
 

1994 births
Living people
Swedish footballers
Sweden youth international footballers
Swedish people of Bosniak descent
Swedish expatriate footballers
Association football defenders
GAIS players
Utsiktens BK players
FK Mjølner players
Notodden FK players
Brattvåg IL players
Ungmennafélagið Víkingur players
NK Olimpija Ljubljana (2005) players
FC Schaffhausen players
Neuchâtel Xamax FCS players
Slovenian PrvaLiga players
Allsvenskan players
Superettan players
Norwegian Second Division players
Swiss Challenge League players
Expatriate footballers in Norway
Expatriate footballers in Iceland
Expatriate footballers in Slovenia
Expatriate footballers in Switzerland
Swedish expatriate sportspeople in Norway
Swedish expatriate sportspeople in Iceland
Swedish expatriate sportspeople in Slovenia
Swedish expatriate sportspeople in Switzerland
People from Kungälv Municipality
Sportspeople from Västra Götaland County